Pizza Pops are a Canadian calzone-type snack produced by Pillsbury. Pizza Pops are sold both pre-cooked and frozen. Typically, they can be reheated in a microwave oven. However, they may also be cooked in a conventional oven.

History

Pizza Pops were invented by Paul Faraci (September 13, 1928 – February 6, 2018) of Winnipeg, Manitoba, Canada in 1964; they were conceived as a modification of traditional cheese-filled Italian turnovers such as calzone or panzerotti. The rights to Pizza Pops were later sold to Pillsbury. Pizza Pops are currently manufactured by General Mills at a factory in Winnipeg.

Varieties 
Pizza Pops come in several varieties such as "Hawaiian", "Three Meat", "Pepperoni", "Pepperoni & Bacon", "Deluxe", "Cheese Burger", "Canadian", "Poutine" and "Three Cheese".  All varieties of Pizza Pops, except for poutine and Three Cheese, contain pizza sauce, pizza topping, and meat. They may also contain vegetables, such as green peppers or mushrooms, and artificial colours and flavours such as Yellow 5.

Chili Pops and Veggie Pops were introduced at the same time in the 1980s but were discontinued within a few years. Chili Pops were reintroduced along with the introduction of Fajita Pops in the 1990s, but both were also discontinued within a few years.

Pizza Pops are only available in Canada.

See also
 List of Canadian inventions and discoveries
 Hot Pockets
 Pizza rolls
 List of frozen food brands
 Panzerotti
 Totino's Pizza Stuffers

References

External links
Pizza Pops official website
Pizza Pops product page at General Mills Canada's website

Canadian snack foods
Frozen pizza brands
General Mills brands
Calzones
Cuisine of Manitoba